Newbury is an unincorporated community in Wabaunsee County, Kansas, United States.  As of the 2020 census, the population of the community and nearby areas was 78.  It is located approximately 2 miles northwest of Paxico.

History
A post office was opened in Newbury in 1870, and remained in operation until it was discontinued in 1888.

Demographics

For statistical purposes, the United States Census Bureau has defined this community as a census-designated place (CDP).

Education
The community is served by Wabaunsee USD 329 public school district.

References

Further reading

External links
 Wabaunsee County maps: Current, Historic, KDOT

Unincorporated communities in Wabaunsee County, Kansas
Unincorporated communities in Kansas